John Gregory Clay (born May 1, 1964) is a former American college and professional football player who was an offensive tackle in the National Football League (NFL) for two seasons during the late 1980s.  Clay played college football for the University of Missouri, and thereafter, played professionally for the Los Angeles Raiders and the San Diego Chargers of the NFL.

Clay was born in St. Louis, Missouri.

He was drafted by the Los Angeles Raiders in the first round (15th pick overall) of the 1987 NFL Draft.

After his rookie season, the Raiders traded Clay to the San Diego Chargers in exchange for star offensive lineman Jim Lachey. 

On 1/5/2016, John Gregory Clay was officially named as the head coach of the Cahokia Comanche football team. 

1964 births
Living people
All-American college football players
American football offensive tackles
Los Angeles Raiders players
Missouri Tigers football players
Players of American football from St. Louis
San Diego Chargers players

http://www.bnd.com/sports/high-school/prep-football/article53123360.html